Arthur Thompson (24 November 1911 – 1978) was a British wrestler. He competed in the men's freestyle lightweight at the 1936 Summer Olympics.

References

External links
 

1911 births
1978 deaths
British male sport wrestlers
Olympic wrestlers of Great Britain
Wrestlers at the 1936 Summer Olympics
Place of birth missing